Andrzej Smirnow (born 9 September 1938) is a Polish politician. He was elected to the Sejm on 25 September 2005, getting 10,263 votes in 20 Warsaw district as a candidate from the Civic Platform list.

He was also a member of Sejm 1991-1993 and Sejm 1997-2001.

See also
Members of Polish Sejm 2005-2007

External links
Andrzej Smirnow - parliamentary page - includes declarations of interest, voting record, and transcripts of speeches.

Members of the Polish Sejm 2005–2007
Members of the Polish Sejm 1991–1993
Members of the Polish Sejm 1997–2001
Civic Platform politicians
1938 births
Living people
Members of the Polish Sejm 2007–2011
Members of the Polish Sejm 2011–2015